Frank Hodgins (5 April 1888 – 11 March 1966) was an Australian rules footballer who played with Geelong in the Victorian Football League (VFL).

Notes

External links 

1888 births
1966 deaths
Australian rules footballers from Victoria (Australia)
Geelong Football Club players